The Moses Carlton House is a historic house on Hollywood Boulevard in Alna, Maine.  Built in 1810 by Moses Carlton, a prominent area businessman, as a wedding present for his daughter, it and its associated outbuildings are a well-preserved example of an early 19th-century Maine farmstead.  The property was listed on the National Register of Historic Places in 2002.

Description and history
The Moses Carlton House stands in a rural area east of the village of Head Tide, on  overlooking the Sheepscot River. The house is surrounded by two barns and a carriage shed, all of 19th-century construction. The house is a -story wood-frame structure, five bays wide, with a side-gable roof, clapboard siding, and a granite foundation. The main facade faces south, and has a center entrance flanked by pilasters and topped by a four-light transom window and corniced entablature. A single-story ell extends to the rear. The interior follows a center-chimney plan, with a narrow winding stair in the entry vestibule, with parlors on either side of the chimney, and the old kitchen behind it.

Moses Carlton was one of the leading businessmen of nearby Wiscasset, which was the largest shipping port east of Boston in the 1790s.  Carleton had five daughters, and built a house for each one, either in Alna or neighboring Whitefield.  This house was probably built sometime between 1796 and 1810, for his daughter Elizabeth and her husband John Dole, who were married in 1796 and known to be occupying the house in 1810.  It was sold out of the Carleton family in 1866.

See also
National Register of Historic Places listings in Lincoln County, Maine

References

Houses on the National Register of Historic Places in Maine
Federal architecture in Maine
Houses completed in 1810
Houses in Lincoln County, Maine
National Register of Historic Places in Lincoln County, Maine